Sir Richard Wingfield (c. 1510 – 1557/59), of Portsmouth, Hampshire, was an English politician.

He was a Member (MP) of the Parliament of England for Portsmouth in March 1553.

References

1510 births
1550s deaths
English MPs 1553 (Edward VI)
Politicians from Portsmouth
Richard